Janko Matúška (10 January 1821 – 11 January 1877) was an ethnic Slovak poet, activist, occasional playwright, and clerk of the court in the Kingdom of Hungary. He is best known as the author of the Slovak national anthem, "Nad Tatrou sa blýska" ("Lightning over the Tatras"), based on the melody of a Slovak folk song, "Kopala studienku".

Life 
Janko Matúška was born into a craftsman's family in Dolný Kubín, then part of the Kingdom of Hungary. He began to attend school there, then probably at the Gymnázium of Gemer (Sajógömör) and finally he studied at the prestigious Lutheran Lyceum of Pressburg (preparatory high school and college) where he took courses in the Institute of Czechoslovak Language and Literature while majoring in theology. Ľudovít Štúr, the only professor teaching courses offered by the institute at that time, was fired in December 1843 under pressure from the kingdom's authorities, who objected to his pro-Slovak activism. 23-year-old Janko Matúška wrote "Lightning over the Tatras" when he and other students were agitated about the subsequent repeated denials of their appeals to the school board to reverse Štúr's dismissal. About two dozen students, including Matúška, decided to leave the lýceum in protest in March 1844. Matúška went to take his final exams at the Lutheran gymnázium in Tisovec (Tiszolc). He lived in Orava (Árva) for most of his adult life, and stopped writing after the Hungarian Revolution of 1848. He worked in government offices after 1850, and was Clerk of the County Court in Dolný Kubín from 1870 to 1875. He died the day after his 56th birthday and was buried in Dolný Kubín.

Works 
He started writing at the lyceum. He focused on poetry, especially ballads and fables. He also wrote some prose and drama and translated from Polish, for instance Dziady by Adam Mickiewicz.

Poetry 

 1844 - Nad Tatrou sa blýska
 Púchovská skala
 Svätý zákon
 Hrdoš
 Sokolíček plavý
 Preletel sokolík nad tichým Dunajom
 Slepý starec
 Po dolinách
 Vzdychy spod Lysice
 Kozia skala

Prose 
 Zhoda liptovská (novella)

Selections and collections 

 1921 - Janka Matúšku Zobrané spisy básnické
 1971 - Piesne a báje, selection from poetry, prose and drama

Drama 
 1846 - Siroty

References

External links 

 Janko Matúška at Osobnosti.sk 

1821 births
1877 deaths
People from Dolný Kubín
Slovak poets
National anthem writers